Pacific Gate by Bosa is a residential skyscraper under construction in San Diego, California. Upon completion, the building will be 450 ft (137.2 m) tall and will become the seventh tallest building in the city, tied with the Pinnacle Marina Tower. It was first proposed in 2012 and began construction in 2015. Pacific Gate will contain 41 floors and 216 apartments. The building was completed in the late 2010s.

See also
List of tallest buildings in San Diego

References

Condominiums in the United States